Bernard Gerald Quinlan (August 1885 – 11 September 1951) was an Australian cricketer and doctor. The son of Timothy Quinlan and grandson of Daniel Connor, both Irish-born politicians, Quinlan was born in Perth, Western Australia, and educated at the University of Adelaide, later progressing to Dublin University, where he studied medicine. While in Ireland, Quinlan played for the university's cricket team against touring English county teams, and later represented the Irish cricket team in the traditional match against Scotland, in what was to be his only first-class match. With Ireland declaring their first innings with the loss of six wickets, Quinlan did not bat, but took a total of three wickets while bowling. After his graduation in 1913, Quinlan returned to Western Australia, where he practised medicine. During Australia's involvement in World War I, he was made an honorary captain in the Australian Army Medical Corps, later being made a captain in the Australian Army Reserve. Quinlan later moved to Malvern, Victoria, a suburb of Melbourne. He died at the Repatriation General Hospital in Heidelberg in September 1951, and was buried in the Roman Catholic section of the Springvale Cemetery. His younger brother, Patrick Francis Quinlan, also played cricket for Ireland, having studied alongside him at Dublin University.

References

1885 births
1951 deaths
Alumni of Trinity College Dublin
Australian cricketers
Australian military doctors
Australian people of Irish descent
Australian Roman Catholics
Burials in Victoria (Australia)
Cricketers from Perth, Western Australia
Ireland cricketers